Graves is the plural of grave, a location where a dead body is buried. Graves or The Graves may also refer to:

Geography
 Graves (wine region), a wine region of Bordeaux
 Graves, Georgia, a community in the United States
 The Graves (Massachusetts), group of rock outcroppings in Massachusetts Bay

Arts and entertainment
 Graves (band), a band featuring former Misfits members Michale Graves and Dr. Chud
 Graves (TV series), an American comedy television series
 The Graves (film), a 2009 film directed by Brian Pulido
 "Graves" (song), a 2022 song by KB and Brandon Lake
 Graves, a 2017 song by Caligula's Horse from their album In Contact
Graves, a 2018 song by Chvrches from their album Love Is Dead

Other uses
 Graves (surname), people
 Graves (food), a byproduct of the rendering process used in animal feed
 Graves' disease, hyperthyroid disease
 Graves (system), a French satellite tracking system
 Julian Graves, a health food retailer in the United Kingdom

See also
 Grave (disambiguation)
 The Grave (disambiguation)
 The Graves (disambiguation)
 Justice Graves (disambiguation)